Jean Graczyk (26 May 1933 – 27 June 2004) was a professional road bicycle racer who won two points classifications in the Tour de France and several stages each at the Tour de France and Vuelta a España. Before turning professional, Graczyk won an Olympic silver medal in the team pursuit for France.

His nickname in the sport was Popof. The American-French journalist René de Latour jokingly said in the British monthly Sporting Cyclist that it was because of his habit of attacking alone, or "popping off". De Latour, however, depended too heavily on his readers' understanding of French slang, because Popof is a semi-derogatory term in French for someone of Polish background. The "popping off" suggestion, however, is still widely believed and appears from time to time in histories of the sport.

Major results 

1956
Summer Olympics:
 Silver medal team pursuit
 national amateur road race champion
1957
Vailly-sur-Sauldre
Tour du Sud-Est
1958
Cluny
Orchies
Vuelta a España:
Winner stage 13B
Pleurtuit
Tour de France:
  Winner Points classification
1959
Antibes
Hyères
Ronde d'Aix-en-Provence
Saint-Denis l'Hotel
Trofeo Longines (with Jacques Anquetil, André Darrigade, Seamus Elliott and Michel Vermeulin)
Paris–Nice
Tour de France:
Winner stage 5
1960
Tour de France:
Winner stages 4, 12, 17 and 21
 Winner Points classification
Critérium International
 Super Prestige Pernod International
Brignolles
GP Monaco
Saint-Claud
Saint-Hilaire de Harcouet
1961
Challenge Laurens
GP de Fréjus
Neuvic sur l'isle
Roma-Napoli-Roma
Saint-Just-sur-Loire
Sanvignes
Vailly-sur-Sauldre
La Charité-sur-Loire
1962
GP Vercors
Lubersac
Vuelta a España:
Winner stages 6, 13, 14 and 16
Soings
1963
GP Monaco
Soing-en-Sologne
Vailly-sur-Sauldre
Royan
Montélimar
1964
Gap
Montélimar
1965
Belvès
Sin-le-Noble
Vailly-sur-Sauldre
Montélimar
1969
Quesnoy

References

External links 

Official Tour de France results for Jean Graczyk

1933 births
2004 deaths
Sportspeople from Cher (department)
French male cyclists
French Tour de France stage winners
Olympic silver medalists for France
French people of Polish descent
French Vuelta a España stage winners
Cyclists at the 1956 Summer Olympics
Olympic cyclists of France
Olympic medalists in cycling
Medalists at the 1956 Summer Olympics
French track cyclists
Super Prestige Pernod winners
Cyclists from Centre-Val de Loire